Michael D. Malatin is an American entrepreneur. He founded his first company, Healthcare Parking Systems of America, in 1997. It was the first hospital-based parking, patient transport, and guest services provider specifically for US hospitals. In 2007, he sold HPSA to ABM industries, and served for 4 years until it had assimilated into the public entity.
 
In 2012 he launched another startup, Pinnacle Automotive Hospitality, which provides auto dealerships nationwide with managed contract staffing. In 2017, Camden Partners acquired a majority stake in the business. 
 
In late 2017, Malatin developed his third venture, The MC2 Group. MC2 Group is a consulting firm that assists businesses in developing recruiting platforms.

Early life and education
Malatin was born in Cleveland, Ohio on July 24, 1970. He was raised in Cincinnati, Ohio where he graduated from Moeller High School in 1988. He went on to attend the University of Cincinnati, where he was a member of Pi Kappa Alpha, and earned a bachelor's degree in Political Science in 1993. Malatin is a classically trained pianist and speaks fluent French.

References

1970 births
Businesspeople from Cleveland
Businesspeople from Cincinnati
University of Cincinnati alumni
Living people